Ella Rubin (born September 2, 2001) is an American actress known for her roles in The Chair, The Girl from Plainville, The Rewrite, and others.

Early life and education 
Rubin was born in New York City and raised on the Upper West Side of Manhattan. She studied theatre and performing arts at the Professional Children's School.

Career 
Rubin made her Broadway debut in the 2019 revival of The Rose Tattoo. In October 2022, it was announced that Rubin had been cast opposite Anne Hathaway in The Idea of You.

Filmography

Film

Television

References 

Living people
American actresses
Actresses from New York (state)
Actresses from New York City
2001 births
People from the Upper West Side